Twentieth of July (German: Der Zwanzigiste Juli) is a 1947 novella by the Austrian writer Alexander Lernet-Holenia. During the Nazi era an aristocratic Austria woman lends her papers to a Jewish acquaintance, only to find herself without an identity when the woman dies.

In 1948 it was adapted into a film The Other Life starring Aglaja Schmid, Robert Lindner and Gustav Waldau.

References

Bibliography
 Robert von Dassanowsky. Austrian Cinema: A History. McFarland, 2005.

1947 novels
Austrian novels
Novels by Alexander Lernet-Holenia